Sasada (written: 笹田) is a Japanese surname. Notable people with the surname include:

Koichi Sasada, Japanese computer scientist
Ludovicus Sasada (1598–1624), Japanese Roman Catholic saint
, Japanese artistic gymnast

Japanese-language surnames